"A Little Bit More" is a song by American singer Kym Sims and produced by Steve "Silk" Hurley. It was written by Eric Miller, Jere McAllister and Berlanda Drake, and released in June 1992 as the third and last single taken from Sims' only album, Too Blind to See It (1992). Featuring backing vocals by Donell Rush and Chantay Savage, it became a club hit and was a top-30 hit on the UK Singles Chart, peaking at number 30. On the UK Dance Singles Chart, it reached number 11. In 2019, a new remix of the song by Dutch techno & progressive DJ Michel De Hey was released.

Critical reception
British Newcastle Evening Chronicle named "A Little Bit More" as one of the best songs of the Too Blind to See It album. In an retrospective review, Pop Rescue felt it "reminds me a LOT of Dannii Minogue's 1991 track 'Baby Love'", adding, "but then, Steve 'Silk' Hurley was behind both tracks, so it’s of no real surprise."

Track listings
 12-inch, UK
"A Little Bit" (MoreRhythm Supply Mix) – 6:25
"A Little Bit" (MoreDub Supply Mix) – 5:06
"A Little Bit" (MoreHurley's Extended Mix) – 6:45
"A Little Bit" (MoreDub Mix) – 5:38
"A Little Bit" (MoreLust Mix) – 4:20

 CD single, UK
"A Little Bit" (MoreHurley's Radio Edit) – 4:05
"A Little Bit" (MoreJoey's Radio Edit) – 3:48
"A Little Bit" (MoreRhythm Supply Mix) – 6:23
"A Little Bit" (MoreDub Supply Mix) – 5:08
"A Little Bit" (MoreHurley's Extended Mix) – 6:47

 CD maxi, Europe
"A Little Bit" (MoreHurley's Radio Edit)
"A Little Bit" (MoreJoey's Radio Edit)
"A Little Bit" (MoreRhythm Supply Mix)
"A Little Bit" (MoreDub Supply Mix)
"A Little Bit" (MoreHurley's Extended Mix)

Charts

References

1992 songs
1992 singles
Atco Records singles
Songs written by Eric Miller (musician)